A postmaster is the head of an individual post office, responsible for all postal activities in a specific post office.  When a postmaster is responsible for an entire mail distribution organization (usually sponsored by a national government), the title of Postmaster General is commonly used. 
Responsibilities of a postmaster typically include management of a centralized mail distribution facility, establishment of letter carrier routes, supervision of letter carriers and clerks, and enforcement of the organization's rules and procedures. The postmaster is the representative of the Postmaster General in that post office. 

In Canada, many early places are named after the first postmaster.

History
In the days of horse-drawn carriages, a postmaster was an individual from whom horses and/or riders (known as postilions or "post-boys") could be hired. The postmaster would reside in a "post house".

The first Postmaster General of the United States was the notable founding father, Benjamin Franklin.

United States
An appointed position, postmasters were prized offices for political party members as they helped keep your political representatives in power.The appointment and removal of most postmasters was handled by the First Assistant United States Postmaster General in Washington, D.C. while postmasters who earned more than $1,000 annually were nominated by the president of the United States and confirmed by the U.S. Senate. The system was often a patronage system, whereby the postmasters would get jobs in an informal way by the party in power.

Historically in the United States, women served as postmasters since the American Revolutionary War and even earlier, under British rule, more than a century before they won the right to vote. The wave of female postmasters appointed during the late 19th century had been a crucial element for women's broader entry into the federal government system.

Many postmasters are members of a management organization that consults with the United States Postal Service (USPS) for compensation and policy. On November 1, 2016, the two organizations, the National Association of Postmasters of the United States (NAPUS) and the National League of Postmasters, merged to form the United Postmasters and Managers of America (UPMA).

Level of pay is based on deliveries and revenue of the post office. Levels are from EAS (Executive and Administrative Service) 18 through 26. Smaller remotely managed post offices no longer have postmasters and report to a nearby larger office. Larger metropolitan post offices are PCES (Postal Career Executive Service).

Notable postmasters
 Madison Davis, first African American postmaster in Athens, Georgia
 Benjamin Franklin, founding father
 Mary Katherine Goddard, only known woman Postmaster when Benjamin Franklin was named the first American Postmaster General 
 Abraham Lincoln, USA president that abolished slavery
 Monroe Morton, African American Postmaster of Georgia
 Isaac Nichols, first postmaster of Australia's post
 Tammy Flores Garman Schoenen, first female postmaster of Guam.
 Helen J. Stewart, first postmaster of Las Vegas, Nevada.
 Alexandrine von Taxis, German Imperial General Postmaster of the Kaiserliche Reichspost
 Gese Wechel, first female postmaster in Sweden
 Benjamin F. Stapleton, mayor of Denver
 Tenzin Losal, first USPS Postmaster from Tibet

See also 
 Postmaster General
 United Kingdom Postmaster General
 United States Postmaster General
 Mail carrier

References

External links

  Maître de poste
 National League of Postmasters
 United Postmasters and Managers of America

 
Government occupations